JTN may refer to:
 Aten, the disk of the sun in ancient Egyptian mythology
 Johnston Atoll (former ISO 3166-1 alpha-3 code: JTN)
Jamyang Tsering Namgyal, Member of lower house of the Parliament of India from Ladakh constituency